Euura crassipes is a species of sawfly belonging to the family Tenthredinidae (common sawflies) and was first described by Carl Gustaf Thomson in 1871. The larvae feed internally in a gall formed on the leaves of downy willow (Salix lapponum).

Description of the gall
Descriptions of the gall differs depending on the source. According to Redfern et al. (2011) the thin-walled gall is globular, 4–10 mm diameter and usually protruding more on the underside of the leaf of downy willow. According to the website Plant Parasites of Europe, the thin-walled gall protrudes equally on either side of the leaf. The gall feels like felt, is hairy and large in relation to the size of the leaf.

Distribution
This species has only been recorded from Finland, Russia (Kola Peninsula), Scotland and Sweden.

References

Tenthredinidae
Gall-inducing insects
Hymenoptera of Europe
Insects described in 1871
Taxa named by Carl Gustaf Thomson
Willow galls